Zanini is a surname. Notable people with the surname include:

Marcel Zanini (1923–2023), French jazz clarinetist
Mario Zanini (1907–1971), Brazilian painter and interior designer
Nicola Zanini (born 1974), Italian footballer
Stefano Zanini (born 1969), Italian cyclist

See also
 Zanin
 Carlos Zannini, Argentine politician

Italian-language surnames
Patronymic surnames
Surnames from given names